Anthony LeJohn Brown (born October 10, 1992) is an American professional basketball player for UNICS Kazan of the VTB United League. He played college basketball for the Stanford Cardinal.

High school career
Brown attended Ocean View High School where he averaged 14.0 points and 6.0 rebounds per game as a junior, while being named league MVP. That year he led the Seahawks to a CIF Southern Section championship and state runner-up finish and was named CIF Southern Section Player of the Year and a member of the first-team all-state. His high school jersey was retired and he was inducted into the Hall of Fame. He was the No. 7-ranked small forward, No. 41 player overall and a four-star recruit by Scout.com.

College career
Brown attended Stanford from 2010 to 2015. Brown had a medical redshirt in his true junior season of 2012–13 due to a hip injury. In his redshirt junior season of 2013–14, he averaged 12.3 points and 5.0 rebounds per game and shot 47.5% from the floor, 45.3% from beyond the arc and 78.5% on free throws. He was named the Pac-12’s Most Improved Player as the Cardinal reached the Sweet 16 of the NCAA Tournament.

As a senior Brown led Stanford to the NIT championship while averaging 14.8 points (10th in the Pac-12), a team-high 6.9 rebounds (8th), and 2.5 assists per game. He had the eighth best free-throw percentage in the Pac-12, at 79.4 per cent. During his career he averaged 10.8 points, 4.8 rebounds and 1.6 assists per game.

Brown completed his bachelor's degree in communication in May 2014 and was enrolled in Stanford's Master of Arts program in media studies in his redshirt senior season.

Professional career

Los Angeles Lakers (2015–2016)
On June 25, 2015, Brown was selected with the 34th overall pick in the 2015 NBA draft by the Los Angeles Lakers. On July 9, he signed with the Lakers. He made his debut for the Lakers on October 30, scoring five points off the bench in a loss to the Sacramento Kings. During his rookie season, he had multiple assignments to the Los Angeles D-Fenders, the Lakers' D-League affiliate. On October 24, 2016, he was waived by the Lakers.

Erie BayHawks and NBA stints (2016–2017)
On October 30, 2016, Brown was selected by the Erie BayHawks with the first overall pick in the 2016 NBA Development League Draft. After averaging 29.3 points, 4.3 rebounds and 4.3 assists in three games, Brown signed with the New Orleans Pelicans on November 21. On December 9, he was waived by the Pelicans. In nine games, he averaged 3.9 points and 2.5 rebounds in 15.9 minutes. Three days later, he returned to Erie.

On January 22, 2017, Brown signed a 10-day contract with the Orlando Magic. On February 2, 2017, after the 10-day contract expired, Brown returned to the BayHawks. Four days later, he was named in the Eastern Conference All-Star team for the 2017 NBA D-League All-Star Game.

Minnesota Timberwolves/Iowa Wolves (2017–2018)
On August 1, 2017, Brown was signed to a two-way contract by the Minnesota Timberwolves. Under the terms of the deal, he will split time between the Timberwolves and their G-League affiliate, the Iowa Wolves. He became the first player in franchise history to sign a two-way contract.

On August 29, 2018, Brown signed with the Philadelphia 76ers on a training camp contract. On October 10, 2018, Brown was waived by the 76ers.

Partizan (2018)
On October 23, 2018, Brown signed with Serbian club Partizan for the rest of the 2018–19 season. On November 27, 2018, he parted ways with Partizan.

Lakeland Magic (2019)
On January 10, 2019, the Lakeland Magic announced via their Twitter account that they had added Brown.

Limoges (2019)
On October 28, 2019, he signed with Limoges CSP of the LNB Pro A.

Montakit Fuenlabrada (2019–2020)
On December 30, 2019, he signed with Montakit Fuenlabrada of the Liga ACB.

Metropolitans 92 (2020–2021)
On July 6, 2020, he signed with Metropolitans 92 of LNB Pro A.

Frutti Extra Bursaspor (2021–2022)
On October 29, 2021, he signed with Frutti Extra Bursaspor of the Turkish Basketbol Süper Ligi (BSL).

Maccabi Rishon LeZion (2022)
On January 12, 2022, he signed with Maccabi Rishon LeZion in the Israeli Basketball Premier League.

BC UNICS (2022–present)
On August 27, 2022, he signed with UNICS Kazan of the VTB United League.

National Team 
Following the close of his freshman year at Stanford University, Brown was selected to represent USA Basketball on the team sent to Latvia for the 2011 FIBA Under −19 World Championship. Brown appeared in five games with his best performance against Egypt, 10 points, five rebounds and three assists. The United States finished 7–2.

NBA career statistics

Regular season

|-
| style="text-align:left;"| 
| style="text-align:left;"| L.A. Lakers
| 29 || 11 || 20.7 || .310 || .286 || .850 || 2.4 || .7 || .5 || .2 || 4.0
|-
| style="text-align:left;"| 
| style="text-align:left;"| New Orleans
| 9 || 0 || 15.9 || .341 || .250 || – || 2.9 || .7 || .6 || .1 || 3.8
|-
| style="text-align:left;"| 
| style="text-align:left;"| Orlando
| 2 || 0 || 8.0 || .444 || .333 || – || 3.5 || 1.0 || .0 || .0 || 4.5
|-
| style="text-align:left;"| 
| style="text-align:left;"| Minnesota
| 1 || 0 || 4.0 || 1.000 || 1.000 || – || .0 || 1.0 || .0 || .0 || 3.0
|-class="sortbottom"
|style="text-align:center;" colspan="2"|Career
| 41 || 11 || 18.6 || .328 || .286 || .850 || 2.5 || .7 || .5 || .1 || 3.9

References

External links

ACB.com profile

NBA D-League profile
Stanford Cardinal bio

1992 births
Living people
21st-century African-American sportspeople
African-American basketball players
American expatriate basketball people in France
American expatriate basketball people in Serbia
American expatriate basketball people in Spain
American men's basketball players
Baloncesto Fuenlabrada players
Basketball players from California
BC UNICS players
Bursaspor Basketbol players
Erie BayHawks (2008–2017) players
Iowa Wolves players
KK Partizan players
Lakeland Magic players
Liga ACB players
Los Angeles D-Fenders players
Los Angeles Lakers draft picks
Los Angeles Lakers players
Metropolitans 92 players
Minnesota Timberwolves players
New Orleans Pelicans players
Orlando Magic players
People from Bellflower, California
People from Fountain Valley, California
Shooting guards
Small forwards
Sportspeople from Los Angeles County, California
Stanford Cardinal men's basketball players